Eldrine (IPA: ɔːlˈdʒɹaɪn, ; stylised as ƎLDRINE and also known as Eldraini) is a Georgian nu metal band that represented Georgia in the Eurovision Song Contest 2011 with the song "One More Day". The current line-up consists of 6 band members: Mariam Tomaradze who replaced Sophio Toroshelidze, Mikheil Chelidze, Irakli Bibilashvili, David Changoshvili, Tamar Shekiladze and Beso Tsikhelashvili. To date, they have released one studio album, entitled Fake Reality. It was released in January 2011, and a re-issued version is planned for release with the inclusion of "One More Day".

Eurovision Song Contest 2011
Eldrine entered and won a national telecast vote to represent Georgia in the 2011 Eurovision Song Contest, in Düsseldorf, Germany.  Just a few days later, it was announced that Sopho Toroshelidze had replaced the band's original singer Tamar Vadachkoria, due to contractual issues.  Eldrine competed into the first semi-final and were drawn as the 9th act to perform.  They finished 6th in the voting, and thus qualified for the final, where they performed last and finished in 9th place with 110 points, receiving 12 points from Lithuania, Ukraine and Belarus.

Band members
Current members
 Sophio Toroshelidze (Sopho) – Lead vocals (2011–present)
 Mikheil Chelidze (Miken) – Lead guitar, backing vocals (2007–present)
 Beso Tsikhelashvili (DJ BE$$) – Rhythm guitar, turntables, backing vocals (2007–present)
 Irakli Bibilashvili (Bibo) – Bass guitar (2007–present)
 David Changoshvili (Chango) – Drums (2007–present)

Former members
 Tamar Vadachkoria (Tako) – Lead vocals (2007–2011)
 Tamar Shekiladze (Tamta) – Keyboards, backing vocals (2007–2012)
 Mariam Tomaradze (Mari) - Lead vocals (2012)

Discography
Albums
 Fake Reality (3-Track Demo) (2011)
 Till The End (2014)

Singles
 "Haunting" (2010)
 "One More Day" (2011)

References

External links
 Official website
 Georgia Eurovision Song Contest

Eurovision Song Contest entrants of 2011
Eurovision Song Contest entrants for Georgia (country)
Heavy metal musical groups from Georgia (country)
Musical groups established in 2007
Musical quintets
Nu metal musical groups